José Miguel de Velasco or Velasco is a province in the Santa Cruz department of Bolivia. Its capital is San Ignacio de Velasco. The province is named after the Bolivian president José Miguel de Velasco Franco. It was created by law on October 12, 1880, during the presidency of Narciso Campero. Until its creation it was integrated into Chiquitos Province.

Geography
Velasco is located between the major Bolivian city of Santa Cruz de la Sierra and the Brazilian border.  An unpaved highway connects the province with the city of Santa Cruz to the west and Brazil to the east.

Subdivision
José Miguel de Velasco Province is divided into three municipalities which are further subdivided into cantons.

Towns in the province include Santa Ana de Velasco.

Culture
Velasco features a mestizo culture, blending the culture of the Spanish conquistadors and missionaries with those of the indigenous peoples.  Spanish is the most commonly used language in public, though indigenous languages, such as Chiquitano, are also used.  Due to the proximity of the province to Brazil, Portuguese speakers can be found, particularly merchants in the city of San Ignacio.  There is a small presence of Mennonites and descendants of post-World War II German immigrants.

Places of interest 
 San Ignacio de Velasco
 San Miguel de Velasco
 San Rafael de Velasco 
 Santa Ana de Velasco

Gallery

See also 
 Jesuit Missions of Chiquitos
 Laguna Bellavista

References

External links 
 Map of the José Miguel de Velasco Province

Provinces of Santa Cruz Department (Bolivia)